Marjorie Wang is an American neurosurgeon, researcher, and academic. She is a professor of Neurosurgery and Director of the Complex Spine Fellowship Program at the Medical College of Wisconsin.

Early life and education 
Wang received her undergraduate degree from Brown University, an MD from Loyola Stritch School of Medicine, and completed her residency at the University of Colorado in 2002. She then attended a complex spine fellowship at the Medical College of Wisconsin in 2006.

In 2011, Wang was selected by the Robert Wood Johnson Foundation to work as a clinical scholar at the University of Washington School of Public Health.

Career 
Wang's research focuses on spine, trauma, and health services. She studied outcomes after traumatic brain injury (TBI), utilization of repeat head CT after trauma, and risks associated with spine surgery.

In 2017, Wang was named chair of the AANS/CNS Joint Section on Disorders of the Spine and Peripheral Nerves (DSPN). She is also Past Chair of the Joint Section on Disorders of the Spine and Peripheral Nerves Editorial Board of Journal of Neurosurgery, Spine Surgeons, serving in 2017–2018.

Selected publications

References 

Living people
American neurosurgeons
University of Wisconsin–Madison faculty
University of Colorado alumni
Brown University alumni
Loyola University Chicago alumni
University of Washington alumni
Year of birth missing (living people)